R. M. Johnston may refer to:

Robert Mackenzie Johnston (1843–1918), Scottish-Australian statistician and naturalist
Rienzi Melville Johnston (1849–1926), American journalist and politician